Jalambadan (also Romanized as Jalambādān; also known as Jolombārān) is a village in Pirakuh Rural District, in the Central District of Jowayin County, Razavi Khorasan Province, Iran. At the 2006 census, its population was 673, in 225 families.

References 

Populated places in Joveyn County